was a Buddhist Rinzai Zen master the chief abbot of Myōshin-ji and Daitoku-ji temples, and a past president of Hanazono University of Kyoto, also known as "Rinzai University."

Biography
Zuigan was influential in the development of Buddhism in America in the early 20th century. He was a student of the Zen master Tetsuo Sōkatsu and followed him to California in 1906 with a group of fourteen who went to the US with Tetsuo Sōkatsu in 1906, attempting strawberry farming in Hayward, California, and founding a branch of Ryomo Kyokai on Sutter Street in San Francisco.

Zuigan returned to Japan in 1910. In 1916 Sōkatsu bestowed upon him the Inka Shōmei. He then spent fifteen years as a missionary in Seoul.

Later, he returned to Japan and taught at the temple Daitoku-ji in Kyoto.

Notable students
Among Zuigan's notable students were:
 The American religious scholar Huston Smith who studied with Zuigan for fifteen years. 
 Pianist Walter Nowick who studied with Zuigan at Daitoku-ji beginning in 1950 until Zuigan's death in 1965. 
 Sōkō Morinaga, Nowick's Dharma brother, who wrote in "Novice to Master: An Ongoing Lesson in the Extent of My Own Stupidity", who was also a head of Hanazono University.
 The Dutch author Janwillem van de Wetering who lived a year and a half in Daitoku-Ji with Nowick under Zuigan's successor Oda Sessō, and described this period of study in the book, "The Empty Mirror: Experiences in a Japanese Zen Monastery."

Dharma heirs
 Oda Sessō 
 Sōkō Morinaga

See also
Buddhism in Japan
List of Rinzai Buddhists

Notes

References

Sources

 
 
 
 
 
 
 
 

Rinzai Buddhists
Zen Buddhist abbots
Japanese Zen Buddhists
People from Hayward, California
People from Ōgaki
1879 births
1965 deaths